Lycosa is a genus of wolf spiders distributed throughout most of the world. Sometimes called the "true tarantula", though not closely related to the spiders most commonly called tarantulas today, Lycosa spp. can be distinguished from common wolf spiders by their relatively large size. This genus includes the European Lycosa tarantula, which was once associated with tarantism, a dubious affliction whose symptoms included shaking, cold sweats, and a high fever, asserted to be curable only by the traditional tarantella dance. No scientific substantiation of that myth is known; the venom of Lycosa spiders is generally not harmful.

As of November 2020, more than 200 species in this genus had been described.

Species list
, the World Spider Catalog accepted the following species:

Lycosa abnormis Guy, 1966 – North Africa
Lycosa accurata (Becker, 1886) – Mexico
Lycosa adusta Banks, 1898 – Mexico
Lycosa affinis Lucas, 1846 – Algeria
Lycosa anclata Franganillo, 1946 – Cuba
Lycosa apacha Chamberlin, 1925 – USA
Lycosa approximata (O. Pickard-Cambridge, 1885) – China (Yarkand)
Lycosa aragogi Nadolny & Zamani, 2017 – Iran
Lycosa arambagensis Biswas & Biswas, 1992 – India
Lycosa ariadnae McKay, 1979 – Australia (Western Australia)
Lycosa articulata Costa, 1875 – Israel
Lycosa asiatica Sytshevskaja, 1980 – Tajikistan
Lycosa aurea Hogg, 1896 – Central Australia
Lycosa auroguttata (Keyserling, 1891) – Brazil
Lycosa australicola (Strand, 1913) – Australia (Western Australia, Northern Territory)
Lycosa australis Simon, 1884 – Chile
Lycosa balaramai Patel & Reddy, 1993 – India
Lycosa barnesi Gravely, 1924 – India
Lycosa baulnyi Simon, 1876 – North Africa
Lycosa bedeli Simon, 1876 – North Africa
Lycosa beihaiensis Yin, Bao & Zhang, 1995 – China
Lycosa bezzii Mello-Leitão, 1944 – Argentina
Lycosa bhatnagari Sadana, 1969 – India
Lycosa biolleyi Banks, 1909 – Costa Rica
Lycosa bistriata Gravely, 1924 – India, Bhutan
Lycosa boninensis Tanaka, 1989 – Taiwan, Japan, Korea
Lycosa bonneti Guy & Carricaburu, 1967 – Algeria
Lycosa brunnea F. O. Pickard-Cambridge, 1902 – Costa Rica, Guatemala, Mexico
Lycosa caenosa Rainbow, 1899 – New Caledonia, Vanuatu
Lycosa canescens Schenkel, 1963 – China
Lycosa capensis Simon, 1898 – South Africa
Lycosa carbonelli Costa & Capocasale, 1984 – Uruguay
Lycosa carmichaeli Gravely, 1924 – India
Lycosa cerrofloresiana Petrunkevitch, 1925 – El Salvador to Panama
Lycosa chaperi Simon, 1885 – India, Pakistan
Lycosa choudhuryi Tikader & Malhotra, 1980 – India, China
Lycosa cingara (C. L. Koch, 1847) – Egypt
Lycosa coelestis L. Koch, 1878 – China, Korea, Japan
Lycosa connexa Roewer, 1960 – South Africa
Lycosa contestata Montgomery, 1903 – USA
Lycosa corallina McKay, 1974 – Australia (Western Australia)
Lycosa coreana Paik, 1994 – Korea
Lycosa cowlei Hogg, 1896 – Central Australia
Lycosa cretacea Simon, 1898 – North Africa
Lycosa dacica (Pavesi, 1898) – Romania
Lycosa danjiangensis Yin, Zhao & Bao, 1997 – China
Lycosa dilatata F. O. Pickard-Cambridge, 1902 – Mexico to El Salvador
Lycosa dimota Simon, 1909 – Australia (Western Australia)
Lycosa discolor Walckenaer, 1837 – USA
Lycosa elysae Tongiorgi, 1977 – St. Helena
Lycosa emuncta Banks, 1898 – Mexico
Lycosa erjianensis Yin & Zhao, 1996 – China
Lycosa erythrognatha Lucas, 1836 – Brazil, Uruguay, Paraguay, Argentina
Lycosa eutypa Chamberlin, 1925 – Panama
Lycosa falconensis Schenkel, 1953 – Venezuela
Lycosa fasciiventris Dufour, 1835 – Portugal, Spain, Morocco
Lycosa fernandezi (F. O. Pickard-Cambridge, 1899) – Chile (Juan Fernandez Is.)
Lycosa ferriculosa Chamberlin, 1919 – USA
Lycosa formosana Saito, 1936 – Taiwan
Lycosa frigens (Kulczyński, 1916) – Russia (West Siberia)
Lycosa fuscana Pocock, 1901 – India
Lycosa futilis Banks, 1898 – Mexico
Lycosa geotubalis Tikader & Malhotra, 1980 – India
Lycosa gibsoni McKay, 1979 – Australia (Western Australia)
Lycosa gigantea (Roewer, 1960) – South Africa
Lycosa gobiensis Schenkel, 1936 – Mongolia, China
Lycosa goliathus Pocock, 1901 – India
Lycosa grahami Fox, 1935 – China
Lycosa gravelyi Biswas & Raychaudhuri, 2014 – Bangladesh
Lycosa guayaquiliana Mello-Leitão, 1939 – Ecuador
Lycosa hawigvittata Barrion, Barrion-Dupo & Heong, 2013 – China
Lycosa hickmani (Roewer, 1955) – New Guinea, Australia (Northern Australia)
Lycosa hildegardae Casanueva, 1980 – Chile
Lycosa hispanica (Walckenaer, 1837) – Spain
Lycosa horrida (Keyserling, 1877) – Colombia
Lycosa howarthi Gertsch, 1973 – Hawaii
Lycosa illicita Gertsch, 1934 – Mexico
Lycosa immanis L. Koch, 1879 – Russia (West Siberia, Far East)
Lycosa impavida Walckenaer, 1837 – USA
Lycosa implacida Nicolet, 1849 – Chile
Lycosa indagatrix Walckenaer, 1837 – India, Sri Lanka
Lycosa indomita Nicolet, 1849 – Chile
Lycosa infesta Walckenaer, 1837 – USA
Lycosa injusta Banks, 1898 – Mexico
Lycosa innocua Doleschall, 1859 – Indonesia (Ambon)
Lycosa inornata Blackwall, 1862 – Brazil
Lycosa insulana (Bryant, 1923) – Barbados
Lycosa insularis Lucas, 1857 – Cuba
Lycosa intermedialis Roewer, 1955 – Libya
Lycosa interstitialis (Strand, 1906) – Algeria
Lycosa inviolata Roewer, 1960 – South Africa
Lycosa iranii Pocock, 1901 – India
Lycosa ishikariana (Saito, 1934) – Russia (Kurile Is.), Japan
Lycosa isolata Bryant, 1940 – Cuba
Lycosa jagadalpurensis Gajbe, 2004 – India
Lycosa japhlongensis Biswas & Raychaudhuri, 2014 – Bangladesh
Lycosa kempi Gravely, 1924 – India, Pakistan, Bhutan, China
Lycosa koyuga McKay, 1979 – Australia (Western Australia)
Lycosa labialis Mao & Song, 1985 – China, Korea
Lycosa labialisoides Peng, Yin, Zhang & Kim, 1997 – China
Lycosa laeta L. Koch, 1877 – Eastern Australia
Lycosa lambai Tikader & Malhotra, 1980 – India
Lycosa langei Mello-Leitão, 1947 – Brazil
Lycosa lativulva F. O. Pickard-Cambridge, 1902 – Guatemala
Lycosa lebakensis Doleschall, 1859 – Indonesia (Java)
Lycosa leucogastra Mello-Leitão, 1944 – Argentina
Lycosa leucophaeoides (Roewer, 1951) – Australia (Queensland)
Lycosa leucophthalma Mello-Leitão, 1940 – Argentina
Lycosa leucotaeniata (Mello-Leitão, 1947) – Brazil
Lycosa liliputana Nicolet, 1849 – Chile
Lycosa longivulva F. O. Pickard-Cambridge, 1902 – Guatemala
Lycosa mackenziei Gravely, 1924 – Pakistan, India, Bangladesh
Lycosa macrophthalma Nadolny & Zamani, 2020 – Iran
Lycosa maculata Butt, Anwar & Tahir, 2006 – Pakistan
Lycosa madagascariensis Vinson, 1863 – Madagascar
Lycosa madani Pocock, 1901 – India
Lycosa magallanica Karsch, 1880 – Chile
Lycosa magnifica Hu, 2001 – China
Lycosa mahabaleshwarensis Tikader & Malhotra, 1980 – India
Lycosa masteri Pocock, 1901 – India
Lycosa matusitai Nakatsudi, 1943 – Japan to Micronesia
Lycosa maya Chamberlin, 1925 – Mexico
Lycosa mexicana Banks, 1898 – Mexico
Lycosa minae (Dönitz & Strand, 1906) – Japan
Lycosa mordax Walckenaer, 1837 – USA
Lycosa moulmeinensis Gravely, 1924 – Myanmar
Lycosa mukana Roewer, 1960 – Congo
Lycosa munieri Simon, 1876 – North Africa, Spain (Balearic Is.), Italy (Sardinia)
Lycosa muntea (Roewer, 1960) – Congo
Lycosa niceforoi Mello-Leitão, 1941 – Colombia
Lycosa nigricans Butt, Anwar & Tahir, 2006 – Pakistan
Lycosa nigromarmorata Mello-Leitão, 1941 – Colombia
Lycosa nigropunctata Rainbow, 1915 – Australia (South Australia)
Lycosa nigrotaeniata Mello-Leitão, 1941 – Colombia
Lycosa nigrotibialis Simon, 1884 – India, Bhutan, Myanmar
Lycosa nilotica Audouin, 1826 – Egypt
Lycosa nordenskjoldi Tullgren, 1905 – Brazil, Bolivia
Lycosa oculata Simon, 1876 – Western Mediterranean
Lycosa ovalata Franganillo, 1930 – Cuba
Lycosa pachana Pocock, 1898 – Central, Southern Africa
Lycosa palliata Roewer, 1960 – South Africa
Lycosa pampeana Holmberg, 1876 – Paraguay, Argentina
Lycosa paranensis Holmberg, 1876 – Brazil, Argentina
Lycosa parvipudens Karsch, 1881 – Kiribati (Gilbert Is.)
Lycosa patagonica Simon, 1886 – Chile
Lycosa pavlovi Schenkel, 1953 – China
Lycosa perkinsi Simon, 1904 – Hawaii
Lycosa perspicua Roewer, 1960 – South Africa
Lycosa philadelphiana Walckenaer, 1837 – USA
Lycosa phipsoni Pocock, 1899 – India to China, Taiwan
Lycosa pia (Bösenberg & Strand, 1906) – Japan
Lycosa picta Biswas & Raychaudhuri, 2014 – Bangladesh
Lycosa pictipes (Keyserling, 1891) – Brazil, Argentina
Lycosa pictula Pocock, 1901 – India
Lycosa pintoi Mello-Leitão, 1931 – Brazil
Lycosa piochardi Simon, 1876 – Syria
Lycosa poliostoma (C. L. Koch, 1847) – Brazil, Paraguay, Uruguay, Argentina
Lycosa poonaensis Tikader & Malhotra, 1980 – India
Lycosa porteri Simon, 1904 – Chile
Lycosa praegrandis C. L. Koch, 1836 – Albania, North Macedonia, Bulgaria, Greece, Turkey, Ukraine, Russia (Europe), Caucasus, Kazakhstan, Iran, Central Asia
Lycosa praestans Roewer, 1960 – Botswana
Lycosa proletarioides Mello-Leitão, 1941 – Argentina
Lycosa prolifica Pocock, 1901 – India
Lycosa pulchella (Thorell, 1881) – New Guinea, Papua New Guinea (Bismarck Arch.)
Lycosa punctiventralis (Roewer, 1951) – Mexico
Lycosa quadrimaculata Lucas, 1858 – Gabon
Lycosa rimicola Purcell, 1903 – South Africa
Lycosa ringens Tongiorgi, 1977 – St. Helena
Lycosa rostrata Franganillo, 1930 – Cuba
Lycosa rufisterna Schenkel, 1953 – China
Lycosa russea Schenkel, 1953 – China
Lycosa sabulosa (O. Pickard-Cambridge, 1885) – China (Yarkand)
Lycosa salifodina McKay, 1976 – Australia (Western Australia)
Lycosa salvadorensis Kraus, 1955 – El Salvador
Lycosa separata (Roewer, 1960) – Mozambique
Lycosa septembris (Strand, 1906) – Ethiopia
Lycosa sericovittata Mello-Leitão, 1939 – Brazil
Lycosa serranoa Tullgren, 1901 – Chile
Lycosa shahapuraensis Gajbe, 2004 – India
Lycosa shaktae Bhandari & Gajbe, 2001 – India
Lycosa shansia (Hogg, 1912) – China, Mongolia
Lycosa shillongensis Tikader & Malhotra, 1980 – India
Lycosa signata Lenz, 1886 – Madagascar
Lycosa signiventris Banks, 1909 – El Salvador, Costa Rica
Lycosa sigridae (Strand, 1917) – Mexico
Lycosa similis Banks, 1892 – USA
Lycosa singoriensis (Laxmann, 1770) – Central to eastern Europe, Turkey, Caucasus, Russia (Europe to South Siberia), Iran, Central Asia, China, Korea
Lycosa sochoi Mello-Leitão, 1947 – Brazil
Lycosa storeniformis Simon, 1909 – Guinea-Bissau
Lycosa subfusca F. O. Pickard-Cambridge, 1902 – Mexico, Costa Rica
Lycosa suboculata Guy, 1966 – North Africa
Lycosa suzukii Yaginuma, 1960 – Russia (Far East), China, Korea, Japan
Lycosa sylvatica (Roewer, 1951) – Algeria
Lycosa tarantula (Linnaeus, 1758) (type species) – France (Corsica), Italy, Balkans, Turkey, Middle East
Lycosa tarantuloides Perty, 1833 – Brazil
Lycosa tasmanicola Roewer, 1960 – Australia (Tasmania)
Lycosa teranganicola (Strand, 1911) – Indonesia (Aru Is.)
Lycosa terrestris Butt, Anwar & Tahir, 2006 – Pakistan
Lycosa tetrophthalma Mello-Leitão, 1939 – Paraguay
Lycosa thoracica Patel & Reddy, 1993 – India
Lycosa thorelli (Keyserling, 1877) – Colombia to Argentina
Lycosa tista Tikader, 1970 – India, Bangladesh
Lycosa transversa F. O. Pickard-Cambridge, 1902 – Guatemala
Lycosa trichopus (Roewer, 1960) – Afghanistan
Lycosa tula (Strand, 1913) – Australia (Western Australia)
Lycosa u-album Mello-Leitão, 1938 – Argentina
Lycosa vachoni Guy, 1966 – Algeria
Lycosa vellutina Mello-Leitão, 1941 – Colombia
Lycosa ventralis F. O. Pickard-Cambridge, 1902 – Mexico
Lycosa vittata Yin, Bao & Zhang, 1995 – China
Lycosa wadaiensis Roewer, 1960 – Chad
Lycosa wangi Yin, Peng & Wang, 1996 – China
Lycosa woonda McKay, 1979 – Australia (Western Australia)
Lycosa wroughtoni Pocock, 1899 – India
Lycosa wulsini Fox, 1935 – China
Lycosa yalkara McKay, 1979 – Australia (Western Australia)
Lycosa yerburyi Pocock, 1901 – Sri Lanka
Lycosa yizhangensis Yin, Peng & Wang, 1996 – China
Lycosa yunnanensis Yin, Peng & Wang, 1996 – China

References

External links
 Lycosa - arachnos.eu

Lycosidae
Araneomorphae genera
Cosmopolitan spiders